Abell 12 is a planetary nebula located in the constellation of Orion. Abell 12 is known as "the hidden planetary" because of the foreground star Mu Orionis making it difficult to observe and Abell 12 being at an apparent magnitude of about 14. The best way for it to be observed is through narrowband filters such as H-alpha and O-III. The nebula is 6,900 light years away from Earth, north of Betelgeuse. Other names for Abell 12 are PNG 198.6-06.3, PK 198-06.1 and ARO 220. The northern outer red hydrogen shell has been ruptured allowing the interior oxygen to spill out.

References

External links
 
 
Abell 12
12
Orion (constellation)